Mordellistena basilunulata is a beetle in the genus Mordellistena of the family Mordellidae. It was described in 1936 by Pic.

References

basilunulata
Beetles described in 1936